Mesoheros is a genus of cichlids. It is found in Colombia, Ecuador, and Peru; Atrato River flowing into the Atlantic, San Juan, Baudó and Patia Rivers to Esmeraldas and Tumbes Rivers flowing into the Pacific.

Species
There are currently 4 recognized species in this genus:
 Mesoheros atromaculatus (Regan, 1905)
 Mesoheros festae (Boulenger, 1899) (Red Terror)
 Mesoheros gephyrum
 Mesoheros ornatus (Regan, 1905)

References

Heroini
Fish of Central America
Cichlid genera
Taxa named by Prosanta Chakrabarty